USA Harvest is a charity organization founded in Louisville, Kentucky in 1987. Volunteers pick up surplus food from restaurants, hotels, hospitals, and various other food suppliers and deliver it to missions, soup kitchens, shelters and people in need.

The Goo Goo Dolls used to pick up food in their concerts in benefit of the organization.
Actress Scarlett Johansson auctioned off her used facial tissue on eBay with proceeds benefitting the charity. The tissue earned US$5,300

References

External links
 Official website

Charities based in Kentucky
Hunger relief organizations
Poverty in the United States
1987 establishments in Kentucky